Balrampur is an Assembly constituency of the Uttar Pradesh Legislative Assembly, covering the city of Balrampur in the Balrampur district of Uttar Pradesh, India. Balrampur is one of five assembly constituencies in the Shravasti Lok Sabha constituency. Since 2008, this assembly constituency is numbered 294 amongst 403 constituencies.

Members of Vidhan Sabha
 1974 : Man Bahadur Singh (Congress)  
 1977 : Ashfaq (Janata Party)
 2017 : Palturam (BJP)

Election results

2022

2017
Bharatiya Janta Party candidate Palturam won in last Assembly election of 2017 Uttar Pradesh Legislative Elections defeating Indian National Congress candidate Shivlal by a margin of 24,860 votes.

 Palturam (BJP) : 89,401 votes (won by 24,860 votes)
 Shivlal (INC) : 64,541

1977 Vidhan Sabha
 Ashfaq (JNP) : 18,909 votes
 Man Bahadur (Cong) : 15,526

References

External links
 

Assembly constituencies of Uttar Pradesh
Balrampur